The 28th edition of the annual Hypo-Meeting took place on June 1 and June 2, 2002 in Götzis, Austria. The track and field competition, featuring a decathlon (men) and a heptathlon (women) event, was part of the 2002 IAAF World Combined Events Challenge.

Men's Decathlon

Schedule

June 1

June 2

Records

Results

Women's Heptathlon

Schedule

June 1

June 2

Records

Results

Notes

See also
2002 Decathlon Year Ranking
2002 European Athletics Championships – Men's Decathlon
2002 European Athletics Championships – Women's heptathlon

References
 decathlon2000
 IAAF results
 athledunet 

2002
Hypo-Meeting
Hypo-Meeting